The Royal Aberdeen Children's Hospital or RACH is a children's hospital in Aberdeen, Scotland. It is situated on the Foresterhill site, with the Aberdeen Royal Infirmary and Aberdeen Maternity Hospital and provides services to children across the North of Scotland. It is managed by NHS Grampian.

History
The hospital has its origins in a private house at Castle Hill which opened in 1877. It was evacuated to Kepplestone House during the First World War. It moved to a new facility which was designed by William Kelly and opened on the Foresterhill site in 1928. After the hospital had been completely rebuilt to modern standards, it re-opened in January 2004.

In 2012 the hospital revised its policy around the age of patients who could be admitted for care, raising the limit from 14 to 16 years of age.

Performance
The hospital's performance against the four-hour target in emergency departments was 99.6% ranking third best in Scotland in August 2015.

References

External links 
Archie Fund

Hospital buildings completed in 1929
Children's hospitals in the United Kingdom
Teaching hospitals in Scotland
NHS Grampian
Hospitals in Aberdeen
Aberdeen
Childhood in Scotland
NHS Scotland hospitals